Iurie Osipenco (born 6 July 1974 in Hîncești) is a Moldavian professional football manager, currently in charge of Speranța Nisporeni, and former footballer.

Previously, from February to June 2017 he was the head coach of Moldavian football club Petrocub Hîncești.

References

External links
 
 
 Iurie Osipenco at Footballdatabase

1974 births
Living people
Association football midfielders
FC Zimbru Chișinău players
Moldovan Super Liga players
Moldovan footballers
Moldova international footballers
Footballers from Chișinău
Moldovan football managers
FC Milsami Orhei managers
CS Petrocub Hîncești managers
FC Zimbru Chișinău managers
Speranța Nisporeni managers
Moldovan Super Liga managers